The Woodland Conference is a high school athletics conference in Southeastern Wisconsin. It is overseen by the Wisconsin Interscholastic Athletic Association (WIAA).  Members of the conference are: Brown Deer, Cudahy, Greendale, Greenfield, New Berlin Eisenhower, New Berlin West, Pewaukee, Shorewood, South Milwaukee, Pius XI, Milwaukee Lutheran, Wisconsin Lutheran, West Allis Central and Whitnall. The commissioner is Paul Feldhausen.

Membership history 
1993-1997
Brookfield Central
Brookfield East
Cudahy
Franklin
Greendale
Greenfield
South Milwaukee
Wauwatosa East
Wauwatosa West
1997-2006
Cudahy
Greendale
Greenfield
Milwaukee Thomas More
New Berlin Eisenhower
New Berlin West
Wauwatosa West
Whitnall

Divisions (2006-2008)
With the addition of four new members for 2006-07 academic year from the now-defunct Parkland Conference, the Woodland Conference split into two six-team divisions:

North Division
Brown Deer Falcons
Pewaukee Pirates
New Berlin Eisenhower Lions
New Berlin West Vikings
Shorewood Greyhounds
Wauwatosa West Trojans
South Division
Cudahy Packers
Greendale Panthers
Greenfield Hustlin' Hawks
St. Francis Mariners
St. Thomas More Cavaliers
Whitnall Falcons

Divisions (2009-2011)
South Milwaukee joined the conference for the 2009-2010 academic year.  The Woodland Conference rearranged into Black and Blue Divisions, based on school enrollment.

Black Division
Greendale Panthers
Greenfield Hustlin' Hawks
New Berlin Eisenhower Lions
South Milwaukee Rockets
Wauwatosa West Trojans
Whitnall Falcons
Blue Division
Brown Deer Falcons
Cudahy Packers
New Berlin West Vikings
Pewaukee Pirates
St. Francis Mariners
St. Thomas More Cavaliers
Shorewood Greyhounds (independent for football only)

Divisions (2012-2016 )
Milwaukee Pius XI joined the Woodland Conference, leaving the Classic Eight.  Thomas More leaves the Woodland to join a new conference, the Metro Classic. St. Francis leaves the Woodland to join a new conference, the Midwest Classic.

Woodland East
Brown Deer Falcons
Cudahy Packers
Greenfield Hustlin' Hawks
South Milwaukee Rockets
Shorewood Greyhounds
Whitnall Falcons
Woodland West
Greendale Panthers
New Berlin Eisenhower Lions
New Berlin West Vikings
Pewaukee Pirates
Pius XI Popes
Wauwatosa West Trojans

Divisions (2017- )
Milwaukee Lutheran, Wisconsin Lutheran, and West Allis Central all joined the Woodland in the 2017-18 academic year. Wauwatosa West left for the Greater Metro Conference.

Woodland East
Brown Deer Falcons 
Cudahy Packers 
Greenfield Hustlin' Hawks
Milwaukee Lutheran Red Knights
South Milwaukee Rockets
Shorewood Greyhounds 
Whitnall Falcons
Woodland West
Greendale Panthers
New Berlin Eisenhower Lions
New Berlin West Vikings
Pewaukee Pirates 
Pius XI Popes
West Allis Central Bulldogs
Wisconsin Lutheran Vikings

Conference champions

Football

New Woodland Conference Football Championship (2013- ) 

Legend

Boys' basketball

Girls' basketball

Baseball

Wrestling

Boys' soccer

Girls' soccer

State tournament appearances

1993-1994: Cudahy, Football Division 2 Champion
1993-1994: Brookfield East, Boys' Soccer Division 1 Champion
1993-1994: Brookfield Central, Girls' Tennis Runner Up
1994-1995: New Berlin Eisenhower, Division 3 Champion
1994-1995: Greendale, Summer Baseball Champion
1994-1995: Brookfield Central, Boys' Swimming Division 2 Champion
1994-1995: Greendale, Girls' Tennis Division 2 Champion
1994-1995: Brookfield East, Boys' Swimming Division 2 Runner Up
1994-1995: Greendale, Girls' Basketball Division 2 Semi-Final
1994-1995: Greendale, Boys' Basketball Division 2 -Final (loss)
1994-1995: Brookfield Central, Boys' Soccer Division 1 Quarterfinal
1995-1996: New Berlin Eisenhower, Division 3 Champion
1995-1996: Brookfield East, Boys' Soccer Division 1 Champion
1995-1996: Wauwatosa East, Girls' Soccer Division 1 Champion
1995-1996: Brookfield Central, Boys' Swimming Division 2 Champion
1995-1996: Brookfield East, Boys' Swimming Division 2 Runner Up
1995-1996: Greendale, Boys' Soccer Division 2 Runner Up
1996-1997: Wauwatosa East, Girls' Soccer Division 1 Champion
1996-1997: Brookfield East, Boys' Swimming Division 2 Champion
1996-1997: Wauwatosa East, Boys' Basketball Division 1 Quarterfinal
1996-1997: Wauwatosa East, Summer Baseball Quarterfinal
1996-1997: Greendale, Girls' Tennis Division 2 Runner Up
1996-1997: Broofield Central, Boys' Soccer Division 1 Semifinal
1996-1997: Brookfield Central, Girls' Tennis Division 1 Runner Up
1997-1998: Greendale, Girls' Tennis Division 2 Champion
1997-1998: New Berlin Eisenhower, Boys' Soccer Division 2 Runner Up
1997-1998: Greendale, Fastpitch Softball Division 2 Runner Up
1998-1999: Greenfield, Fastpitch Softball Division 1 Quarterfinal
1998-1999: New Berlin Eisenhower, Girls' Soccer Division 2 Runner Up
1999-2000: New Berlin West, Boys' Basketball Division 2 Champion
1999-2000: Greendale, Girls' Tennis Division 2 Champion
1999-2000: Whitnall, Girls' Swimming Division 2 Champion
1999-2000: New Berlin Eisenhower, Fastpitch Softball Division 2 Semifinal
2000-2001: Milw. Thomas More, Girls' Volleyball Division 2 Champion
2000-2001: Whitnall, Girls' Swimming Division 2 Champion
2000-2001: Whitnall, Summer Baseball Quarterfinal
2000-2001: New Berlin Eisenhower, Fastpitch Softball Division 1 Quarterfinal
2001-2002: Whitnall, Girls' Swimming Division 2 Runner Up
2002-2003: Cudahy, Girls' Track & Field Division 2 Runner Up
2003-2004: Whitnall, Boys' Basketball Division 1 Quarterfinal
2003-2004: New Berlin Eisenhower, Fastpitch Softball Division 1 Quarterfinal
2003-2004: Greenfield, Boys' Volleyball Quarterfinal
2004-2005: Whitnall, Girls' Basketball Division 1 Quarterfinal
2004-2005: Greendale, Fastpitch Softball Division 2 Semi-Final
2004-2005: Brown Deer, Boys' Track and Field Division 2 Runner Up
2005-2006: Greendale, Fastpitch Softball Division 2 Champion
2005-2006: Brown Deer, Boys' Track and Field Division 2 Runner Up
2005-2006: Shorewood, Boys' Cross Country Division 2 Champion
2005-2006: Cudahy, Summer Baseball Semi-Final
2005-2006: Greenfield, Fastpitch Softball Division 1 Quarterfinal
2005-2006: Shorewood, Boys' Volleyball Semi-Final
2006-2007: Greendale, Football State Final
2006-2007: Brown Deer, Girls' Track & Field Division 2 Champion
2006-2007: Shorewood, Boys' Cross Country Division 2 Champion
2006-2007: Milw. Thomas More, Boys' Soccer Division 3 Champion
2006-2007: Greendale, Girls' Basketball Division 2 Semi-Final
2006-2007: Greenfield, Boys' Volleyball Quarterfinal
2006-2007: Brown Deer, Girls' Track and Field Division 2 Champions
2007-2008: Wauwatosa West, Boys' Soccer Division 1 Semi-Final
2007-2008: Shorewood, Boys' Cross Country Division 2 Runner Up
2007-2008: New Berlin Eisenhower, Boys' Basketball Division 2 Champions
2007-2008: Pewaukee, Wrestling Division 2 Semi-Final
2007-2008: New Berlin Eisenhower, Fastpitch Softball Division 2 Champions
2007-2008: Brown Deer, Girls' Track and Field Division 2 Runner Up
2007-2008: Brown Deer, Boys' Track and Field Division 2 Champions
2007-2008: Brown Deer, Summer Baseball Semi-Final
2008-2009: Pewaukee, Boys' Soccer Division 2 Semi-Final
2008-2009: Pewaukee, Wrestling Division 2 Semi-Final
2009-2010: Pewaukee, Wrestling Division 2 Finals
2012-2013: New Berlin West, Baseball State Champs
2012-2013: New Berlin West, Girls' Softball Semi-Final
2015-2016:  New Berlin West, Girls' Softball State Champions

See also
List of high school athletic conferences in Wisconsin

References 

Conference Champions. Woodland Conference. Retrieved on 2008-05-26.

External links 
Woodland Conference
Wisconsin Interscholastic Athletic Association
Brown Deer High School
Cudahy High School
Greendale High School
Greenfield High School
New Berlin Eisenhower High School
New Berlin West High School
Pewaukee High School
Shorewood High School
St. Francis High School
South Milwaukee High School
St. Thomas More High School
Wauwatosa West High School
Whitnall High School

Wisconsin high school sports conferences
High school sports conferences and leagues in the United States